Nathan Amarkine D'Laryea (born 3 September 1985, in Manchester) is an English former footballer who played as a defender. He was a product of the Manchester City academy and played for clubs including Rochdale, Macclesfield Town and Hyde FC.

Career

Early career
D'Laryea started out as a trainee at Manchester City. Before being released by City, he had a spell on loan at Macclesfield Town during the 2006–07 season. He joined Rochdale but made only eight appearances in two seasons and he quit professional football to study for a degree in English Language at the University of Manchester.

Hyde
In July 2009 D'Laryea signed for Conference North semi-professional club Hyde United. He made his debut for Hyde in the first game of the 2009–2010 season against Stafford Rangers. He scored his first Hyde goal in March 2010 in the Tameside derby against Stalybridge Celtic. He became a regular for Hyde at centre back until late in his first season when he acquired an injury that kept him out for the remainder of the season and the start of 2010–11 season.

Personal life
His twin brother, Jonathan D'Laryea, is also a professional footballer and currently plays for AFC Mansfield. The D'Laryea brothers are of Ghanaian descent.

In 2012 D'Laryea was working as a secondary school teacher at Dixons Allerton Academy in Bradford and where he teaches maths. He recently moved to Manchester To work at Loreto High School, Chorlton.

Referee
In April 2011, it was announced that he had commenced a post-playing career as referee for Leisure Leagues 6-a-side football in Oldham.

References

External links

Nathan D'Laryea at hydefc.co.uk
Profile at rochdaleafc.co.uk

1985 births
Living people
English footballers
English football referees
Manchester City F.C. players
Macclesfield Town F.C. players
Rochdale A.F.C. players
Hyde United F.C. players
English Football League players
Twin sportspeople
English twins
English people of Ghanaian descent
Mathematics educators
Association football defenders
Association football midfielders